The 1926 Nevada Wolf Pack football team was an American football team that represented the University of Nevada in the Far Western Conference (FWC) during the 1926 college football season. In their second season under head coach Buck Shaw, the team compiled a 4–4 record (3–1 FWC) and finished second in the conference.

Schedule

References

Nevada
Nevada Wolf Pack football seasons
Nevada Wolf Pack football